American hemorrhagic fever may refer to:

 Argentine hemorrhagic fever
 Bolivian hemorrhagic fever